Gajashastra (Sanskrit: 'Elephant lore') is an Indian manual on elephants dated to 6th-5th century BCE attributed to Palakapya.

Description 
It mentions destruction of habitat by elephants in the Anga Mahajanapada during the reign of King Romapeda (Lomapada). It also includes information regarding habitat of elephants in the Indian subcontinent including present day states of Rajasthan, Punjab, Andhra, Gujarat, Madhya Pradesh etc. and details on how to capture and train them.

See also 
 Shalihotra

References 

Hindu literature
Ancient Indian literature
Mammalogical literature
Elephants in Indian culture
Elephantology in India
Sanskrit literature
Indian non-fiction literature